3169 Ostro, provisional designation , is a Hungaria family asteroid from the innermost regions of the asteroid belt, approximately 5 kilometers in diameter.

The asteroid was discovered on 4 June 1981, by American astronomer Edward Bowell at Lowell's Anderson Mesa Station in Flagstaff, Arizona, and named after planetary scientist Steven J. Ostro at JPL.

Orbit and classification 

Ostro is a member of the Hungaria family, which form the innermost dense concentration of asteroids in the Solar System. It orbits the Sun at a distance of 1.8–2.0 AU once every 2 years and 7 months (950 days). Its orbit has an eccentricity of 0.07 and an inclination of 25° with respect to the ecliptic.

Physical characteristics 

In the Tholen and SMASS taxonomy, Ostro is classified as a TS-type and Xe-type asteroid, respectively. It has also been characterized as an E-type asteroid.

According to the survey carried out by NASA's Wide-field Infrared Survey Explorer with its subsequent NEOWISE mission, Ostro measures 4.662 kilometers in diameter and its surface has an outstandingly high albedo of 0.960. The Collaborative Asteroid Lightcurve Link derives an albedo of 0.5152 and a diameter of 5.27 kilometers with an absolute magnitude of 12.73.

In May 2012, a rotational lightcurve of Ostro was obtained from photometric observations by American astronomer Brian Warner. Lightcurve analysis gave a well-defined rotation period of 6.503 hours with a brightness amplitude of 0.79 magnitude.

Naming 

This minor planet was named after American planetary scientist Steven J. Ostro at the Jet Propulsion Laboratory of the California Institute of Technology. The approved naming citation was published by the Minor Planet Center on 14 April 1987.

References

External links 
 Lightcurve plot of 3169 Ostro, Palmer Divide Observatory, B. D. Warner (2012)
 Asteroid Lightcurve Database (LCDB), query form (info )
 Asteroids with Satellites, Robert Johnston, johnstonsarchive.net
 Dictionary of Minor Planet Names, Google books
 Asteroids and comets rotation curves, CdR – Observatoire de Genève, Raoul Behrend
 Discovery Circumstances: Numbered Minor Planets (1)-(5000) – Minor Planet Center
 
 

003169
Discoveries by Edward L. G. Bowell
Named minor planets
003169
003169
003169
19810604